Colombia competed at the 2020 Summer Olympics in Tokyo. Originally scheduled to take place from 24 July to 9 August 2020, the Games were postponed to 23 July to 8 August 2021, because of the COVID-19 pandemic. It was the nation's twentieth appearance at the Summer Olympics, with the exception of Helsinki 1952.

Medalists

Competitors
The following is the list of number of competitors participating in the Games:

Archery

One Colombian archer secured an Olympic place in the women's individual recurve by advancing to the semifinal match, as the highest-ranked athlete not already qualified, at the 2019 Pan American Games in Lima, Peru. Another Colombian archer scored a gold-medal triumph to book one of three available spots in the men's individual recurve at the 2021 Pan American Qualification Tournament in Monterrey, Mexico.

Artistic swimming

Colombia fielded a squad of two artistic swimmers to compete in the women's duet event, by finishing ninth and securing the last of the eight available spots at the 2021 FINA Olympic Qualification Tournament in Barcelona, Spain.

Athletics

Colombian athletes further achieved the entry standards, either by qualifying time or by world ranking, in the following track and field events (up to a maximum of 3 athletes in each event):

Track & road events
Men

Women

Field events

Combined events – Women's heptathlon

Boxing

Colombia entered six boxers (four men and two women) to compete in each of the following weight classes into the Olympic tournament. With the cancellation of the 2021 Pan American Qualification Tournament in Buenos Aires, Rio 2016 Olympians Ceiber Ávila (men's featherweight), Jorge Vivas (men's light heavyweight), and medalists Yuberjen Martínez (men's flyweight) and Ingrit Valencia (women's flyweight), along with two rookies (Salcedo and Arias), finished among the top five of their respective weight divisions to secure their places on the Colombian squad based on the IOC's Boxing Task Force Rankings for the Americas.

Cycling

Road
Colombia entered a squad of six riders (five men and one woman) to compete in their respective Olympic road races, by virtue of their top 50 national finish (for men) and her top 100 individual finish (for women) in the UCI World Ranking.

Track
Following the completion of the 2020 UCI Track Cycling World Championships, Colombia entered one rider to compete in the men's sprint and keirin based on his final individual UCI Olympic rankings.

Sprint

Keirin

BMX
Colombian riders qualified for three quota places (two men and one woman) in the BMX at the Olympics, as a result of the nation's fifth-place finish for men and sixth for women in the UCI BMX Olympic Qualification Ranking List of 1 June 2021.

Diving

Colombia entered three divers into the Olympic competition by virtue of a top twelve finish in the men's springboard at the 2019 FINA World Championships and by winning the gold medal in the same event at the 2019 Pan American Games in Lima, Peru.

Equestrian

Colombia entered one equestrian rider into the Olympic competition by finishing among the top ten and securing the second of four available slots in the individual jumping at the 2019 Pan American Games in Lima, Peru.

Jumping

Fencing

Colombia entered one fencer into the Olympic competition. Set to compete at her third consecutive Games, Saskia van Erven claimed a spot in the women's foil as the top-ranked fencer vying for qualification from the Americas in the FIE Adjusted Official Rankings.

Golf

Colombia entered two golfers (one per gender) into the Olympic tournament. Sebastián Muñoz (world no. 67) and Rio 2016 Olympian Mariajo Uribe (world no. 306) qualified directly among the top 60 eligible players for their respective events based on the IGF World Rankings.

Gymnastics

Trampoline
Colombia qualified one gymnast for the men's trampoline by winning the gold medal at the 2021 Pan American Championships in Rio de Janeiro.

Judo

Colombia qualified one judoka for the women's middleweight category (70 kg) at the Games. Set to compete at her fourth straight Games, London 2012 bronze medalist Yuri Alvear accepted a continental berth from the Americas as the nation's top-ranked judoka outside of direct qualifying position in the IJF World Ranking List of June 28, 2021. She was forced to withdraw due to an injury.

Shooting

Colombia granted an invitation from ISSF to send Bernardo Tobar Prado in the men's rapid fire pistol to the Olympics, as long as the minimum qualifying score (MQS) was fulfilled by June 6, 2021.

Skateboarding

Colombia entered one skateboarder into the Olympic tournament. Jhancarlos González was automatically selected among the top 16 eligible skateboarders in the men's street based on the World Skate Olympic Rankings of June 30, 2021.

Swimming

Colombia received a universality invitation from FINA to send two top-ranked swimmers (one per gender) in their respective individual events to the Olympics, based on the FINA Points System of June 28, 2021.

Taekwondo

Colombia entered two athletes into the taekwondo competition at the Games. Jefferson Ochoa (men's 58 kg) and 2019 Pan American Games bronze medalist Andrea Ramirez (women's 49 kg), secured the spots on the Colombian squad with a top two finish each in their respective weight classes at the 2020 Pan American Qualification Tournament in San José, Costa Rica.

Tennis

Colombia entered four tennis players into the Olympic tournament. Juan Sebastián Cabal and Robert Farah qualified directly for the men's doubles by virtue of their combined top 10 placement in the ATP World Rankings of 14 June 2021. Following the consequent withdrawals of several tennis players, Daniel Elahi Galán (world no. 111) and María Camila Osorio (world no. 94) filled the available slots allocated by the original entrants in their respective singles events based on the ATP and WTA World Rankings of June 14, 2021.

Weightlifting

Colombia entered three weightlifters (two men and one woman) into the Olympic competition. Rio 2016 bronze medalist Luis Javier Mosquera (men's 67 kg) and rookie Brayan Rodallegas (men's 81 kg), with Mercedes Pérez (women's 64 kg) going to her third straight Games on the women's side, secured one of the top eight slots each in their respective weight divisions based on the IWF Absolute World Ranking.

Wrestling

Colombia qualified three wrestlers for each of the following classes into the Olympic competition. One of them finished among the top six to book Olympic spots in the men's freestyle 86 kg at the 2019 World Championships, while two more licenses were awarded to Colombian wrestlers, who progressed to the top two finals of the men's freestyle 57 kg and men's Greco-Roman 67 kg, respectively, at the 2020 Pan American Qualification Tournament in Ottawa, Canada.

Freestyle

Greco-Roman

See also 
 Colombia at the 2019 Pan American Games
 Colombia at the 2020 Winter Youth Olympics

References 

Nations at the 2020 Summer Olympics
2020
2021 in Colombian sport